The 11th Marine Division (11. Marine Division) was an infantry formation of the German Kriegsmarine under the control of the German Heer during the Second World War.

History 
The 11th Marine Division was formed in the Reichskommissariat Niederlande (Netherlands) in March 1945 from troops of the Kommandierender Admiral in den Niederlanden (Commanding Admiral in the Netherlands).  On formation, the division was attached to Army Corps Detachment Diestel, part of the 25th Army.  However, the division was never properly formed and as of 12 April was still badly organised.  For that reason it was disbanded and its infantry battalions were handed over to army units.

Organisation 
The divisional organisation was as follows:

 Divisional Headquarters – Formerly 2nd Ships Cadre Regiment at Beverloo Camp
 111th Marine Rifle Regiment – Formerly 14th Ships Cadre Battalion at Breda
 112th Marine Rifle Regiment – Formerly 16th Ships Cadre Battalion at Bergen op Zoom
 113th Marine Rifle Regiment – Formerly 20th Ships Cadre Battalion at Ede
 11th Marine Divisional Troops

Commanders 
The only commander of the division was Naval Captain Hans Ahlmann.

Footnotes

References 

 
 

Infantry divisions of Germany during World War II
Military units and formations established in 1945
Military units and formations disestablished in 1945
Military units and formations of the Kriegsmarine